Jeff Roth is the archivist in charge of the New York Times clipping and photo archive, known as "the morgue." After working for a while at an airport, Roth joined the Times archive in 1993; the newspaper slowly reduced the number of its filing staff until he was the only one taking care of the archive. In Obit, Roth described how the Times archive is still used to make obituaries.

Ghislaine Maxwell Connection

Roth is a cousin of British former socialite and convicted sex offender Ghislaine Maxwell. As a family member, Roth attended the 2021 trial in which Maxwell was convicted of child sex trafficking. In June 2022, Roth described Maxwell as a "friend and confidant" in a letter filed in Manhattan Federal Court by Maxwell's attorneys.

Further reading

References

People from New York (state)
American archivists
The New York Times people
Living people
Year of birth missing (living people)